Miri Jiyori (literally: The Miri Maiden) is an Assamese novel written by Rajanikanta Bordoloi. The book unveils some important aspects of then-contemporary Mising society and a series of their customs and traditions. It is a social novel based on a simple love story.

Plot summary
Miri Jiyori (1894) is a love story by Rajanikanta Bordoloi set in the Miri (now referred to as the Mishing) community. A passionate story about doomed love, it was written at a time when the novel as a literary form was yet in a nascent stage. With a deeply sympathetic portrayal of a young Miri couple who matured from being childhood companions to a deeply committed but doomed couple in love, the novel is also a statement on the Mising community as well as a compassionate plea of humanism. (Note: this text is taken from Tezpur University website)

Characters
 Panoi
 Jonkie
 Nirama (Panoi's mother)
 Tamed (Panei's father)
 Komud 
 Dalimi

References

External links

1894 novels
19th-century Indian novels
Assamese literature
Assamese-language books
Novels set in Assam
Assamese novels